Namivand-e Sofla (also Romanized as Nāmīvand-e Soflá; also known as Nāmīvand-e Pā'īn) is a village in Chaqa Narges Rural District, Mahidasht District, Kermanshah County, Kermanshah Province, Iran. At the 2006 census, its population was 167, in 36 families.

References 

Populated places in Kermanshah County